Shaggy & Scooby-Doo Get a Clue! is an American animated comedy series produced by Warner Bros. Animation, the tenth incarnation of Hanna-Barbera's Scooby-Doo franchise.

The show debuted on September 23, 2006, and ran for two seasons during the Kids' WB Saturday morning block of The CW Television Network, ending on March 15, 2008. It was the final animated series to involve Hanna-Barbera's co-founder Joseph Barbera before his death in 2006.

Plot
The premise of the show revolves around the fact that Shaggy Rogers' incredibly rich Uncle Albert Shaggleford disappears and names Shaggy as his sole heir for an inheritance. With the help of the inheritance, Shaggy has upgraded the Mystery Machine, giving it the ability to transform itself into a number of other different vehicles, like the "Hotdog Making Machine".

Dr. Albert Shaggleford had made some enemies before disappearing. Among the most dangerous is the archetypal evil genius and technology pirate out to take over the world and or become immortal—Dr. Phineas Phibes (who gets his name from the Vincent Price villain The Abominable Dr. Phibes). Dr. Phibes recruits other sidekicks and minions to help him with his plans, among them Dr. Trebla.

It appears that the supposedly late Dr. Shaggleford was, beyond being rich, an inventor in his own right, and his clueless young heir is now in possession of some very interesting nano technology. The top secret nanotech formula has been mixed in with Scooby Snacks, which, when eaten, cause a variety of day-saving side effects.

Shaggy and Scooby-Doo have a mission: armed with an updated Mystery Machine, a loyal robot servant named Robi, their new riches, and the new and improved Scooby Snacks, they must stop the evil plans of Phineas Phibes and save the world. In episode 2, Shaggy upgrades the Mystery Machine from its original form, to a high-tech transforming vehicle. However, it usually transforms into machines inappropriate for the tasks at hand (however, in episode 11, it does transform into vehicles appropriate to finish the Polar Bear 3000). In their spare time, Shaggy and Scooby are fans of the show Chefs of Steel, and the famous mystery solver Chad Chaddington.

Episodes

Characters

Main
 Norville "Shaggy" Rogers (voiced by Scott Menville): Shaggy is no longer a vegetarian in the series. 
 Scooby-Doo (voiced by Frank Welker): Shaggy's pet and best friend. He usually saves the day by consuming a nano-infused Scooby Snack which gives him an incredible power of some such.
 Robi (voiced by Jim Meskimen): A loyal robotic servant of Shaggy and Scooby-Doo. He is either defective or a failed experimental butler, but either way he has a tendency to bust through walls and other highly destructive things without second thoughts. Robi would also have different uses for Shaggy and Scooby, though he is a rather lousy cook, various impressions, and giving out safety tips (in a style similar to Inspector Gadget). He also projects holograms of Uncle Albert when he wants to talk with Shaggy. Robi also usually calls Scooby "Rooby Roo" due to misunderstanding Scooby's voice.
 Dr. Albert Shaggleford (voiced by Casey Kasem): Shaggy's rich uncle who is a genius inventor. He always sends a transmission to Shaggy from an undisclosed location on Phibes' doings. As of the final episode, it is revealed that he was undercover as Dr. Trebla all along (when you invert Trebla it is spelled Albert) and transmitting from Phibes' lair. He is allergic to peanuts.
 Dr. Phineus Phibes (voiced by Jeff Bennett): A mad scientist and the primary antagonist of the series. In his younger age, Phibes conducted a highly dangerous experiment with electricity, which cost him his left hand (he wears a prosthetic that seems to function as a high-tech Swiss Army knife) and makes him a living lightning rod—hence, he seldom ventures outdoors, as doing so makes him susceptible to being struck by lightning, regardless of the weather. Producer Eric Radomski had this to say about Dr. Phibes: "Dr. Phibes' exterior lair is deco influenced, and in the 13th episode, we introduce a feline friend of Dr. Phibes.  Ray DeLaurentis would need to confirm, but I believe your assumption is correct. Dr. Phibes is Col. Klink plus Dr. Evil divided by Strangelove."
 Dr. Trebla (voiced by Scott Menville): Dr. Trebla is Dr. Phibes' right-hand man who gives him advice and sees to his needs like his constant companion. In the series finale he is revealed to have been Uncle Albert working undercover all along revealing how he could give info on Phibes regularly to Shaggy and Scooby.  A clue before this revelation is that his name is in fact Albert spelled backwards.
 Agent 1 (voiced by Jim Meskimen): Agent 1 is serious and hates Shaggy and Scooby. He often works with Agent 2, much to his chagrin, and the second in command. Agent 1 is also the one never to believe what his agents ever tell him, until he sees proof, as seen in "Zoinksman". He is often told to smack Agent 2 when he annoys Dr. Phibes. He is the only one who is more easily annoyed by Agent 2 than Dr. Phibes is.
 Agent 2 (voiced by Jeff Bennett): Agent 2 is a somewhat dimwitted and heavyset man who resents his name and wishes to be called something else. Among other personas he's adopted was a ninja in "High Society Scooby" and a racer called Dr. Speed. In one episode, his real name is revealed to be Jeff, a reference on his voice actor's name, however in an earlier episode, he is called Zachary.

Supporting
 Fred Jones (voiced by Frank Welker): Made an appearance in "Almost Ghosts".
 Daphne Blake (voiced by Grey DeLisle): Made an appearance in "Almost Ghosts".
 Velma Dinkley (voiced by Mindy Cohn): Made an appearance in "Almost Ghosts".
 Agent 3 (voiced by Frank Welker): Agent 3 is a timid, but honest agent.
 Agent 4 (voiced by Scott Menville): Agent 4 is a strong agent.
 Agent 13 (voiced by Frank Welker): Dr. Phibes' elderly father.
 Ricky and Mark (voiced by Jeff Bennett and Jim Meskimen): Dr. Phibes' "techies." They are parodies of Napoleon Dynamite and his brother Kip Dynamite. They work for Dr. Phibes and make evil inventions for his own use. Even though they work for Dr. Phibes they will help Shaggy and Scooby if they need it.
 Menace (voiced by Frank Welker): A super-strong villain who is Dr. Phibes' latest minion. After trying the nanotech formula, his strength was increased, but after a while, began to lose his mind. He developed a fondness for kittens (unfortunate for Dr. Phibes, who at the time had used some stolen nanotech to turn himself into a cat) and had smiley faces on his biceps. An obvious parody of Bane.

Production
Ray DeLaurentis was asked by Warner Bros. Animation to develop a new show for the Kids' WB programming block. Due to internal struggles at Time Warner, DeLaurentis was only allowed to use characters associated with the Hanna-Barbera library and was offered Scooby-Doo as the previous series, What's New Scooby-Doo, was considered too similar to the original series and wanted something more broad. DeLaurentis developed the concept in "three and half days" when he decided to do a show that solely focused on the titular characters and, with the help of veteran Matt Danner, began to add the elements that would eventually make up the series. The character of Dr. Phibes was created because DeLaurentis was a fan of over-the-top villains and specifically chose Jeff Bennett to voice him during development.

The characters have also been re-designed to look like animated versions of how they appeared in the live-action Scooby-Doo film. For instance, Scooby is drawn with dot eyes and Shaggy's hair is noticeably longer.  Thus, it is the third show in the Scooby-Doo series, after A Pup Named Scooby-Doo and followed by Be Cool, Scooby-Doo!, that is not animated or drawn in the usual Hanna-Barbera style. DeLaurentis commented on this; admitting that he was not a fan of the look of the final series, calling it 
"dark" compared to previous incarnations, "they just assigned those people to me... the unit production managers are literally the only people in the production that have no skill set [sic] are given this sort of leeway to drive people crazy." Eric Radomski was in charge of the design of the series.

This is also the first series in which Casey Kasem does not voice Shaggy, but is instead done by Scott Menville, although Scott Innes or Billy West portrayed the character in many of the Scooby-Doo animated movies made for television or home video. However, in this series, Kasem does voice Shaggy's rich and on-the-run Uncle Albert. Another noticeable difference is that Shaggy now wears a white short-sleeved shirt with a green strip across the middle and green sleeves instead of his trademark green T-shirt. Frank Welker still does Scooby's voice. In addition, Shaggy and Scooby's cowardice tendencies have been considerably toned down and are shown to be quite skilled.

Much like The 13 Ghosts of Scooby-Doo on ABC in 1985 (which had actual ghosts and monsters) and the Scooby-Doo and Scrappy-Doo shorts in 1980, this show is different from the usual "crooks masquerading as ghosts and monsters" series. Fred Jones, Daphne Blake and Velma Dinkley are downgraded, but not completely absent as they were in the Scooby-Doo and Scrappy-Doo shorts. They cameo in the first episode and have full guest appearances in another season one episode. Fred and Daphne appear as silent cameos in one season two episode when they were not allowed to Dr. Phibes's "attractive people" party. Their silhouettes run across the screen in the opening credits in amongst the silhouettes of all the show's regular cast. DeLaurentis revealed that the limited appearances were intentional as he wanted Shaggy and Scooby-Doo to develop as individuals and to provide a contrast as to how they have matured. However, he admitted that if given more time he would have made them appear more frequently.

The final episode "Uncle Albert Alert", was written entirely by DeLaurentis during a rather hectic time at Warner Bros. Animation. The building he was working in had already been sold to DeVry University and Amazon and he only had the weekend to write the whole episode, "[DeVry and Amazon] were literally jackhammering my wall... so I put in big wax earplugs... with some noise cancelling headphones over them... and I just wrote the episode." DeLaurentis had no ideas for a season three, but predicted that Dr. Phibes had implanted chips into all of his former henchmen that could turn them evil with a flip of a switch.

Home media

References

External links
 
 

Scooby-Doo television series
2000s American animated television series
2006 American television series debuts
2008 American television series endings
American animated television spin-offs
American children's animated comedy television series
American children's animated fantasy television series
American children's animated horror television series
American children's animated mystery television series
English-language television shows
Kids' WB original shows
The CW original programming
Television series by Warner Bros. Animation
Television series by Hanna-Barbera